Carlos Casaravilla (12 October 1900 – 17 February 1981) was an Uruguayan actor. He appeared in 85 films between 1934 and 1978. He starred in the film El Lazarillo de Tormes, which won the Golden Bear at the 10th Berlin International Film Festival.

Selected filmography

 Viva la vida (1934)
 Un señor mucamo (1940)
 Mar abierto (1946) - Don Alberto
 Extraño amanecer (1948)
 The Party Goes On (1948) - Alexis
 Guest of Darkness (1948) - Coronel
 Las aguas bajan negras (1948) - Antón de Juan
 El verdugo (1948)
 La fiesta sigue (1948) - M. Chambom
 Cerca del cielo (1951) - Coronel Barba
 Comedians (1954) - Carlos Márquez
 Death of a Cyclist (1955) - Rafael Sandoval
 Congress in Seville (1955) - Dr. Sergio Radowsky
 Ha pasado un hombre (1956) - Kramer
 Andalusia Express (1956) - Carlos Salinas
 Un fantasma llamado amor (1957)
 The Pride and the Passion (1957) - Leonardo
 The Man Who Wagged His Tail (1957) - Hobo
 La puerta abierta (1957) - Police commissioner
 Heroes del Aire (1958) - Ibáñez
 La muralla (1958) - Alejandro Martínez
 Las locuras de Bárbara (1959)
 El redentor (1959)
 Charlestón (1959) - Don Ramón
 Molokai, la isla maldita (1959)
 Sonatas (1959) - Conde de Brandeso
 S.O.S., abuelita (1959)
 El Lazarillo de Tormes (1959) - Ciego (Blind Man)
 Buen viaje, Pablo (1959) - Velasco
 Ejército blanco (1959)
 El amor que yo te di (1960) - Carreño
 Monsieur Robinson Crusoe (1960)
 The Crossroads (1960) - Comandante
 Un ángel tuvo la culpa (1960) - Sergio Montañés
 Maria, Registered in Bilbao (1960) - Urrutia
 Mi calle (1960) - El astrónomo
 Peace Never Comes (1960) - Dóriga
 Conqueror of Maracaibo (1961) - Jean Brasseur
 Julia y el celacanto (1961) - Don Eulogio Rivera
 Sendas cruzadas (1961)
 Hola, muchacho (1961)
 Teresa de Jesús (1962) - Prior de los Calzados
 Milagro a los cobardes (1962)
 The Son of Captain Blood (1962) - Cpt. Murdock
 Detective con faldas (1962) - Ivan Sharovski
 Los desamparados (1962)
 Face of Terror (1962) - Dr. Reich
 The Legion's Last Patrol (1962) - Ben Bled
 Usted tiene ojos de mujer fatal (1962)
 55 Days at Peking (1963) - Japanese Minister (uncredited)
 Los conquistadores del Pacífico (1963)
 The Ceremony (1963) - Ramades
 Pacto de silencio (1964) - Cnel. Mercier
 Pyro... The Thing Without a Face (1964) - Frade
 Constance aux enfers (1964) - Detective
 Alféreces provisionales (1964) - Comandante médico
 La nueva Cenicienta (1964)
 Saul e David (1964) - Samuel
 El señor de La Salle (1964) - Maestro Soldado
 Crime on a Summer Morning (1965) - Le commissaire (uncredited)
 El puente de la ilusión (1965)
 Assassination in Rome (1965)
 The Hell of Manitoba (1965) - Judge
 Fall of the Mohicans (1965) - Tamenund
 Our Agent Tiger (1965) - Ricardo Sanchez
 Train d'enfer (1965) - Varosky
 La Dama de Beirut (1965) - Comisario de la Interpol
 Platero y yo (1966) - Don Carlos
 Acompáñame (1966)
 Return of the Seven (1966) - First Peon
 Django Does Not Forgive (1966)
 Good Morning, Little Countess (1967)
 I'll Kill Him and Return Alone (1967) - Jackson Murphy
 The Mark of the Wolfman (1968) - Judge Aarno Weismann
 Un hombre solo (1969)
 Malenka (1969) - Dr. Horbinger
 Vivi ragazza vivi! (1971) - capitan Matteo
 The Horsemen (1971) - Messenger (uncredited)
 Rain for a Dusty Summer (1971) - Capt. Lerrera
 Pugni, pirati e karatè (1973) - Pirate (uncredited)
 El francotirador (1978) - Don Gonzalito
 El huerto del Francés (1978)
 Pasión inconfesable (1978) - Daniel (final film role)

References

External links

1900 births
1981 deaths
Spanish male film actors
Uruguayan actors
Male actors from Montevideo
20th-century Spanish male actors